Bettina Köster (born 15 June 1959 in Herford) is a German musician, saxophonist, composer, singer, songwriter and producer.

Career

Mania D: 1979–81
Fall 1978, Köster, student of the Berlin art school Hochschule der Künste, began playing Saxophone for the Berlin underground band DIN A Testbild. In May 1979 Köster started with Karin Luner, Beate Bartel, Eva Gossling and Gudrun Gut an all-girls-band project Mania D.  In Fall 1979 Mania D performed in New York at Arleen Schloss A's, and in the Club Tier 3.

In the same year she opened with Gudrun Gut the store Eisengrau (metalgrey), showing underground fashion, Super 8-movies and artwork as part of the concept. Köster's Eisengrau-concept emerged to a scene hot-spot for Tabea Blumenschein, Alexander von Borsig, Blixa Bargeld and others. 1980 Eisengrau began publishing small editions of tapes with the musical works of underground bands, classifying thereby Eisengrau to a medium for music.

Bettina Köster belonged to a group of Berlin artists named genius dilettantes, who, starting in 1980, performed in quick changing band-formations such as Liebesgier, Nachdenkliche Wehrpflichtige and Einstürzende Neubauten among others. Wolfgang Müller from Die Tödliche Doris invented the characterizing term of the "genius dilettantes" in his book about the Berlin scene published at the Merve-Verlag.
The British radiohost John Peel referred to Köster, Gut and Beate Bartel who meanwhile had separated, during a show on 25. July 1981, as his "Queens of Noise". Mania D's production track 4 was chosen by Peel in his Radio-Show to as the single of the year.

Malaria!: 1981–84
In the same year Köster and Gudrun Gut started the Indie band Malaria! Malaria! gained international recognition with their song "Kaltes klares Wasser", they performed at the New Yorker Studio 54 and Mudd Club. Malaria toured with Siouxsie and the Banshees and The Birthday Party among others. As a lyricist Köster influenced succeeding girl Bands, such as Chicks on Speed, who released a cover version of Malaria's 1981 Hit "Kaltes Klares Wasser". In Playboy Magazine January 1985 "The Girls of Rock 'n' Roll", she is model together with Grace Jones, Tina Turner, Pat Benatar and Diana Ross.

Solo career: 1984–2009
Köster lived in New York from 1983 to 2001, where she worked as a film author and producer with the director Isabel Hegner. In 1997, Köster composed the music for the film Peppermills, which won 1998 at the Berlinale the Teddy Award in the category Best Short Film. The film was directed by the Swiss Isabel Hegner, later producing a 2003 released documentary "Burma: Anatomy of Terror" which was co produced by Köster. While researching Burma for the film, Köster came across material about the drug princess Olive Yang, laying the foundation for the thriller Mandalay Moon, which she wrote together with Martin Schacht, published 2007 by Rowohlt.
In 2005 Köster performed with the musician Jessie Evans in the supporting program of The Vanishing. This led to the music project Autonervous, releasing an album in 2006.

Current work
Since 2009, when "Queen of Noise" was published on Assinela Records, Vienna, Köster performs regularly with the Viennese drummer Ines Perschy in Clubs and on Festivals like Waregem in Belgium, Wave-Gotik-Treffen in Leipzig/Germany. She lives in southern Italy.

Discography
 1980: Track 4, ManiaD, Monogam
 1980: ManiaD Live in Düsseldorf & SO36, Eisengrau
 1980: White Christmas, Liebesgier, Marat Records (7")
 1981: Malaria (12"), Marat Records
 1981: How Do You Like My New Dog? (7"), Les Disques Du Crépuscule
 1982: Emotion (LP), Moabit Musik
 1982: New York Passage (12"), Jungle Records
 1982: White Water (12"), Les Disques Du Crépuscule
 1982: Die Hausfrauen – New York Berlin, Psycho Records
 1983: Revisited – Live (Kassette), ROIR
 1984: Beat The Distance (12"), Rebel Rec.
 1991: Compiled (CD), Moabit Musik
 1991: Kaltes Klares Wasser (CDM), Moabit Musik
 1992: Elation (CDM), Moabit Musik
 1993: Cheerio (CD), Moabit Musik
 2001: Compiled 1981–1984 (CD)
 2001: Versus EP (12"), Superstar Recordings
 2002: Jürgen Teipel, Frank Fenstermacher: Verschwende Deine Jugend. Punk and New Wave in Deutschland, Track 22, Universal Musik
 2003: Delirium: Remixed, Remade, Remodelled (CD) MFS
 2006: Autonervous (CD)
 2009: Queen of Noise, (CD), Asinella Records
 2017: Kolonel Silvertop (CD), Pale Music

Filmography 
 1980: Woman in Rock, Regie: Wolfgang Büld ARD, VHS, A Studio K7, Berlin
 1998: Peppermills – Regie: Isabel Hegner
 1995: Girls Bite Back – Regie: Wolfgang Büld
 2005: Verschwende Deine Jugend.doc – Regie: Jürgen Teipel & Sigrid Harder
 2011:  arte tracks Malaria! Reportage von Valérie Paillé

 Bibliography 
 Marke B, Berliner Labels. Verbrecher Verlag, Berlin 2002,  (mit Thomas Fehlmann und Daniel Meteo).
 Bettina Köster belongs to the interviewees in Jürgen Teipel's book Verschwende Deine Jugend.''

References

External links 
 Discogs

Living people
German women musicians
Noise musicians
German experimental musicians
Einstürzende Neubauten members
German spoken word artists
1959 births